"Make It Rain Champagne" is a song by Ukrainian singer Verka Serduchka. It was released on 13 December 2019 by Mamamusic as the lead single from her EP Sexy (2020). The song was written by Andreas Öhrn and Peter Boström. It entered the top 10 of the Ukrainian radio chart Tophit.

Live performances
Verka Serduchka performed the song for the first time on 26 December 2019 on the air of the program Evening of premieres with Katya Osadcha. Also live performances with the song took place on the program X-Factor and at the final of the National Selection for Eurovision.

Awards and nominations

Charts

Weekly charts

Year-end charts

References

2019 singles
2019 songs
Verka Serduchka songs
Pop songs
Songs written by Peter Boström